The Ganges river dolphin, or "susu" occur in the Ganges and Brahmaputra, south Asia's largest river systems. It is among the most endangered mammals of the region.

The Ganges river dolphin ranges from 2.3 to 2.6 meters in length. The tail fluke is on average 46 cm in width. Females are larger than males. The color of this dolphin varies from lead-colored to black. The undersides are lighter in color. The rostrum is 18 to 21 cm in length and the forehead is steep and rises abruptly from the base of the snout. The dorsal fin is rudimentary and ridge-like, and the ends of the pectoral fins are squared instead of tapered. The neck is visibly constricted and the blowhole is a longitudinal slit. There are 28 to 29 teeth on either side of the jaw. The eye and optic nerve of the Ganges river dolphin are degenerate. The eye lacks a lens and is therefore incapable of forming images on the retina. However, it functions in light-detection. It is believed that the lack of a true visual apparatus in the river dolphin is related to its habitat; the water in which it lives is so muddied that vision in essentially useless.

Valmiki National Park, West Champaran district, covering about 800 km2 of forest, is the 18th tiger reserve of India, and is ranked fourth in terms of density of tiger population. It has diverse landscapes, sheltering rich wildlife habitats and floral and faunal composition, with the prime protected carnivores.

See also
Flora of Bihar
Protected areas of Bihar
Patna Zoo
Flora of India
Fauna of India

References

External links
 Official Bihar Department of the Environment and Forests

.
Bihar
Tourism in Bihar